George Jackson (January 6, 1958 – February 10, 2000) was a film director and producer. Jackson was born and raised in Harlem, New York and graduated from Fordham Preparatory School and Harvard College. He worked with Doug McHenry as co-producer on such projects as Krush Groove, Jason's Lyric, New Jack City, and Body Count in which he made a cameo appearance as a ticket clerk. Jackson was co-director of the second installment of the House Party series. Subsequently he was President of Motown Records and founded an internet-based media company, Urban Box Office, with Adam Kidron and Frank Cooper.

Jackson died of a stroke in 2000. The George Jackson Academy in New York City was founded in his memory.

References

External links

The George Jackson Academy
Fordham Prep

American film directors
American film producers
African-American film directors
Fordham University alumni
Harvard University alumni
1958 births
2000 deaths
20th-century American businesspeople
20th-century African-American people
Fordham Preparatory School alumni